"Always Leave Them Laughing When You Say Goodbye" was a popular song, first published in 1903, and written by George M. Cohan. Today, the best known recording of the song is by Billy Murray, which was recorded in 1907 with Victor Records, and whose version has entered the public domain. Although very popular in the early 20th century, the song is almost completely forgotten today.

See also
1903 in music
1907 in music
Billy Murray (singer)

External links
 Recording by Billy Murray

Songs about parting
1903 songs
Billy Murray (singer) songs
Songs written by George M. Cohan
Songs from Little Johnny Jones